was a Japanese movie, TV, and stage actor. He appeared in more than 150 films from 1925 to 1975, including 29 of Kinema Junpo’s annual Top-10 winners and three of its 10 best Japanese films of all time. In 2000 the magazine named him one of the 60 most important Japanese actors of the 20th century.

Career
 The son of a Shochiku movie theater owner, Mitsui joined the studio in 1924, making his film debut in 1925 under the name Hideo Mitsui (三井秀男). His short stature, soft features, and expressive face and voice suited him for rebellious “younger brother” roles, and he appeared as a youth lead in many silent and early sound films, notably in several Yasujirō Ozu classics and the “Yota” series, about the antics of a trio of young idlers that also included Akio Isono and Shōzaburō Abe.

Mitsui left Shochiku in 1935 to help found the independent studio Tokyo Hassei (Sound), which was largely staffed by talent who had left Shochiku to bring prestige to the new talkie phenomenon. After the studio folded into Toho in 1941, Mitsui returned to Shochiku, adopting the stage name Kōji Mitsui (三井弘次) after the war and transitioning into character roles. In 1954 he joined other Shochiku performers to create the Madoka (Picture-Perfect) Group, a film production company intended to provide stability to the lives of actors.

Like many popular character actors of post-war Japan, Mitsui occasionally headlined minor films but most often shone in key supporting parts. In 1957, Akira Kurosawa borrowed Mitsui from Shochiku to play the pivotal role of Yoshisaburo the gambler in The Lower Depths, whose final line in the film—annoyed that the suicide of one of the characters has ruined their party—is “always shocking, always devastating when viewed,” and Mitsui's delivery, which breaks the fourth wall, is “absolutely on target: ironic, cruel, funny, horrible.” Kurosawa subsequently borrowed Mitsui (who had appeared in a small part in the director's 1950 Shochiku film Scandal) for five more of his Toho films.

Mitsui often played showy drunken scenes, notably in Kurosawa's Red Beard (1965). Life sometimes imitated art; confronted by director Kaneto Shindo over increasingly unusable takes during a drinking scene, Mitsui said, “What’s the difference between doing what you say and actually doing it?” At the voting for the 1956 Blue Ribbon Awards, Mitsui lost a tie-breaking vote for Best Supporting Actor to his I Will Buy You costar Jun Tatara because of concerns among voters about his on-set behavior. Mitsui was reportedly chastened by the experience and resolved not to drink anymore while performing; he won the award the following year and began the most fruitful and highest-profile period of his career. 

Notoriously, Mitsui was the actor (unnamed in Stuart Galbraith IV’s The Emperor and the Wolf) who drunkenly called Kurosawa a “coward” at his home for not wanting to make any more movies following the failure of 1970's Dodes'ka-den (in which Mitsui had a cameo), after which the director tried to commit suicide; upon learning the news the next day while appearing on a live television program, a horrified Mitsui stopped the interview and rushed to Kurosawa's side.

Mitsui's stage career included prestige productions at the Toho Geijutsuza (Art Theater), which was located in the studio's Tokyo office building. He also created brushed ink sketches of popular co-stars such as Hideko Takamine that were published in entertainment magazines.

In 1971, Mitsui underwent gastric ulcer surgery, further affecting a film career that had slowed by the late 1960s. He increasingly guest-starred on television programs, having appeared on more than 100 shows by the time he played his final role in 1978, on the TV Asahi adaptation of the manga series Haguregumo. When he died of heart failure in 1979, among the survivors were his younger brothers Naomaro Mitsui, a noted artist and associate of the poet Makoto Tsuji, and Tadao Mitsui, a renowned anatomist who had studied as a Fulbright scholar at the University of Washington and served as the president of the Japanese Association of Anatomists from 1975 to 1982.

Honors
In 1957 Mitsui won the Mainichi Film Award for Best Supporting Actor for The Lower Depths as well as his performances in two films directed by Minoru Shibuya, Kichigai buraku (The Unbalanced Wheel) and Seigiha (Righteousness).

That year he also won the Blue Ribbon Award for Best Supporting Actor for The Lower Depths and Kichigai buraku. With these two awards for The Lower Depths, Mitsui was able to distinguish himself among the top performers in Japanese cinema, whom Kurosawa had selected and dress-rehearsed on-set for 60 days to create the ultimate acting ensemble.

On May 24, 1960, Mitsui was the subject of the Asahi Shimbun Interview, an honor reserved for notable members of the arts, sports, political, and business communities.

In 1993, Mitsui was named one of the 50 all-time greatest Japanese actors in a film-industry survey conducted and published by Bungei Shunjū magazine.

In 2000, Kinema Junpo designated Mitsui as one of the top 60 Japanese male stars of the 20th century as determined by a committee of 74 critics, writers, and journalists.

Mitsui was one of the actors commemorated in Seven Supporting Characters, a 2008 film festival held at the now-defunct Cinema Artone in Tokyo's Shimokitazawa entertainment district.

Distinctions
Mitsui was a voice actor in Japan's first sound cartoon, Chikara to Onna no Yo no Naka (1933; now lost), and appeared in Japan's first color film, Carmen Comes Home (1951).

A star of Ozu's 1934 original silent version of A Story of Floating Weeds, he was stunt-cast in the director's own widely acclaimed 1959 color remake, Floating Weeds, which Roger Ebert named as one of the ten greatest films of all time.

Mitsui was featured as a seppuku second in footage pulled from pre-war jidaigeki films that was edited into Frank Capra's World War II propaganda film Know Your Enemy: Japan (1945).

In addition to his many performances for prominent directors such as Kurosawa, Ozu, Kobayashi, and Kinoshita, Mitsui is best known to Western audiences as the duplicitous village elder in Hiroshi Teshigahara's Oscar-nominated Woman in the Dunes (1964), for which he received above-the-title billing on the original film poster along with stars Eiji Okada and Kyōko Kishida.

Legacy
 Mitsui's portrayal of the lazy nihilist in The Lower Depths is well-remembered as a showcase for his improvisational talents and his “oboe-like,” “beautiful voice with its unique charm and sense of rhythm.” The film's final act becomes a tour de force for Mitsui, who mockingly impersonates Bokuzen Hidari (whose character's humanistic influence has been defeated by the gambler's cynicism), leads the remaining denizens in song, and ends the film with his brutal remark. According to frequent co-star Kyōko Kagawa, he was “fabulous” in the film and “great in any role.” Contemporary film reviewers continue to discover Mitsui as “an incredible actor with no sense of fear [whose gambler] is a visceral treat. He is real and relaxed, with no sense of pride or regret.”

Mitsui's largest part for Kurosawa after The Lower Depths was the lead journalist who comments on the wedding reception that opens The Bad Sleep Well (1960); his role as a sarcastic observer was noted by Kurosawa scholar Donald Richie to parallel traits of Yoshisaburo the gambler in the prior film, and Mitsui's “particularly enthralling” performance helped to associate his legacy with sardonic characters as well as boozy ones.

In her 1976 memoir My Professional Diary, Hideko Takamine recalled working with the 23-year-old Mitsui as a child actress on a 1933 "Yota" film, remembering him as "petite, sharp-eyed, and rather quirky. [He] left an impression on me, [and] since then, for more than 40 years, I have been watching [him] obsessively." She referred to him as "Ibushi Gin," a term of respect for distinguished elder actors likening them to rich, oxidized silver.

A portrait of Mitsui was featured in Postwar Focus 293: The Brightness of Dreams [Dream Shine], a 1983 retrospective of works by the noted photojournalist Jun Yoshida.

A 1995 issue of the Bungeishunjū monthly No Side commemorating Japan's great postwar actors included a full-page essay by the writer Midori Nakano celebrating the clear-eyed urban attitude of the characters Mitsui played for Kurosawa, particularly his role in The Lower Depths.

In 2000, the rakugo star and film critic Shiraku Tatekawa named Mitsui one the top three Japanese actors of the 20th century, calling him "addictive," "haunting," and "unforgettable."

At a 2017 event, the actor Tatsuya Nakadai stated that during the filming of Kurosawa's 1963 High and Low, he felt added pressure having to deliver a 10-minute monologue because Mitsui was in the scene. The two also appeared onscreen together in Kobayashi's The Human Condition (1959) and The Inheritance (1962), as well as Okamoto's Battle of Okinawa  (1971); in 1975, Nakadai appeared in a stage production of Gorky's The Lower Depths as the gambler character who was closely associated in Japan with Mitsui's portrayal in Kurosawa's 1957 film version.

In media coverage of the 2017-2018 TV Tokyo reality series “The Supporting Actors,” which featured six popular character actors living together, the stars repeatedly cited Kōji Mitsui as a major influence and an example of a distinctive and superlative member of their profession.

The November 15, 2022 installment of the cat-oriented manga Mon-chan and Me, published in Fusosha's popular webzine Joshi Spa! (Women's Spa!), featured several panels with a guest character designed as a caricature of Mitsui. The January 24, 2023 installment featured him again, as robbery suspect "Shūji Mitsui," derived from blending the kanji characters from the actor's two professional first names, Hideo (秀男) and Kōji (弘次), to create "秀次," literally "Hidetsugu" but more popularly a representation of "Shūji."

Partial filmography

English-language reference works frequently cite Mitsui as a performer in the film Nanami: The Inferno of First Love, but the role is played by a different actor whose name's Kanji characters (満井幸治) also translate to "Kōji Mitsui," and whose only film credit is that role.

References

External links
 

1910 births
1979 deaths
People from Yokohama
Japanese male film actors